The Ottumwa Courier (formerly called Ottumwa Daily Courier) is a three-day (Tuesday, Thursday, Saturday) newspaper published in Ottumwa, Iowa, United States, and covering Wapello County, Iowa. It also publishes digital-only editions on Wednesdays and Fridays. It is owned by Community Newspaper Holdings Inc. (CNHI).

Publishing since 1848, and as a daily newspaper from 1865 to 2020, the Courier is Ottumwa's oldest business. In 1890, it was the original flagship of A.W. Lee's media company, later called Lee Enterprises. The company sold the Courier to Liberty Publishing Group in 1999; two years later, Liberty sold it to CNHI, which has owned it since then.

The newspaper's front page bills itself "Southeast Iowa's Best Newspaper."

References

External links 
 Ottumwa Courier Website
 CNHI Website

Ottumwa Courier
Ottumwa Courier
Ottumwa, Iowa